A double constitutional referendum was held in Uruguay on 27 November 1994 alongside general elections. Voters were asked two questions; whether they approved of two initiatives, one on preventing cuts in pension payments, and one on the proportion of the state budget spent on education. The first question was approved, whilst the second was rejected.

Initiatives

Pension cuts
The pension cuts referendum was initiated by the Association of Retirees through collecting signatures equal to one-tenth of the number of registered voters.

Education budget
The referendum on reserving 27% of the state budget for education was initiated by the Teachers Union by collecting the required number signatures. It would involve amending articles 214, 215 and 220 of the constitution.

Results

Pension cuts

Education budget

References

1994 referendums
1994 in Uruguay
Referendums in Uruguay
Pension referendums
November 1994 events in South America